Events from the year 1567 in Sweden

Incumbents
 Monarch – Eric XIV

Events

 3 February - Polish victory at the Battle of Runafer in Estonia.
 24 May - The King endures a fit of insanity during which he commits the Sture Murders.
 May - Swedish invasion of Norway.
 13 July - The King unofficially marries Karin Månsdotter.
 October - The regency council, which rules during the illness of the King, releases Prince John. 
 October - The Danish army under Daniel Rantzau invades Sweden through Halland, Västergötland and Östergötland, during which he pillages Jönköping, Vadstena and Alvastra and settles in Skänninge.
 20 November - Linköping is burnt when the Swedish army pursues the Danes out of Sweden.
 December - Söderköping is burnt. 
 3 December - Norrköping is burnt. 
 28 December - The King's secret marriage to Karin Månsdotter is revealed.

Births

Deaths

 24 May - Svante Stensson Sture,  statesman   (died 1517)
 24 May - Nils Svantesson Sture, statesman   (died 1543)

References

 
Years of the 16th century in Sweden
Sweden